Delightful is an unincorporated community in Trumbull County, in the U.S. state of Ohio.

History
A post office was established at Delightful in 1880, and remained in operation until it was discontinued in 1902. The founding settlers found the town site "delightful", hence the name.

References

Unincorporated communities in Trumbull County, Ohio
1880 establishments in Ohio
Populated places established in 1880
Unincorporated communities in Ohio